Anthosactis is a genus of cnidarians belonging to the family Actinostolidae.

Species:

Anthosactis capensis 
Anthosactis epizoica 
Anthosactis excavata 
Anthosactis ingolfi 
Anthosactis janmayeni 
Anthosactis nomados

References

Actinostolidae
Hexacorallia genera